Berkovci is a village in the Municipality of Križevci in northeastern Slovenia. The area is part of the traditional region of Styria. It is now included with the rest of the municipality in the Mura Statistical Region.

A small chapel in the settlement was built in the late 19th century.

References

External links
Berkovci on Geopedia

Populated places in the Municipality of Križevci